"Gone Daddy Gone" is a song written by Gordon Gano and originally recorded by his group Violent Femmes as the first single for their first album, Violent Femmes.

The lyrics use a complete verse from Willie Dixon's 1954 song "I Just Want to Make Love to You", originally recorded by Muddy Waters. For this reason, the song is occasionally referred to as "Gone Daddy Gone/I Just Want to Make Love to You", as on Permanent Record: The Very Best of Violent Femmes. It has two xylophone solos.

A cover version of the song was the third single released in the United States by the American soul duo, Gnarls Barkley, and is taken from their first album St. Elsewhere (2006). An animated music video was also made. The cover version was used in a 2008 commercial for the movie Igor, in the TV series Entourage and Chuck, in the 2006 game Tony Hawk's Project 8 and in the 2007 game Forza Motorsport 2.

Personnel
Gordon Gano - guitar, lead vocal
Brian Ritchie - xylophone, electric bass guitar
Victor DeLorenzo - snare drum and tranceaphone, Scotch marching bass drum, vocals

References

1983 singles
1984 singles
Violent Femmes songs
2006 singles
Gnarls Barkley songs
Song recordings produced by Danger Mouse (musician)
Songs written by Willie Dixon
Songs written by Gordon Gano
Slash Records singles
1983 songs